Bayou de Chien is a stream in the U.S. state of Kentucky.

Bayou de Chien is a name derived from the French meaning "dog creek". The prehistoric Adams site is on the banks of Bayou de Chien.

See also
List of rivers of Kentucky

References

Rivers of Fulton County, Kentucky
Rivers of Graves County, Kentucky
Rivers of Hickman County, Kentucky
Rivers of Kentucky